Malapanagudi  is an ancient fortified village in the southern state of Karnataka, India. It is located in the Hospet taluk of Bellary district in Karnataka.

Demographics
 India census, Malapanagudi had a population of 10654 with 5353 males and 5301 females.
There is a primary health centre in the village.

See also
 Bellary
 Districts of Karnataka

References

External links
 http://Bellary.nic.in/

Villages in Bellary district